Machismo is exaggerated masculinity.

Machismo may also refer to:
Machismo (album), 1988, by Cameo
"Machismo", Criminal Minds episode
Machismo E.P., 2000, by Gomez